Basketball competitions at the 2019 Pan American Games in Lima, Peru began on July 27 and continue through August 10. The competitions are taking place at the Coliseo Eduardo Dibos.

This was the Pan American Games debut of 3x3 basketball for both men and women, bringing the total number of basketball events on the program to four. This was done after the International Olympic Committee added the events to the program of the 2020 Summer Olympics in Tokyo, Japan. A total of eight men's and eight women's teams (each consisting of up to twelve athletes) competed in each five-a-side tournament respectively, and six teams competed in each 3x3 tournament (with four athletes per team). This means a total of 240 athletes are scheduled to compete.

Medal table

Medalists

Participating nations
A total of twelve countries qualified basketball teams. The number of athletes is in parentheses.

Qualification
A total of eight men's teams and eight women's teams qualified to compete at the games in the five-a-side tournaments. For the men's event, the top seven teams at the 2017 FIBA AmeriCup, have qualified to compete. In the women's event, the Olympic Champions the United States, have qualified to compete as well as the top six nations at the 2017 FIBA Women's AmeriCup. This is a new system of qualification implemented by FIBA Americas. For each 3x3 tournament, the top five teams in each gender in the world rankings as of November 1, 2018 qualified. Host nation Peru was barred from participating by FIBA, following sanctions imposed on the Peruvian Basketball Federation.

Men's five-a-side

Both the defending gold and silver medallists (Brazil and Canada respectively) failed to qualify.
Peru was banned from the competition and was replaced with Venezuela. Canada as the next best team, declined the reallocated spot.

Women's five-a-side
Both Paraguay and the Virgin Islands qualified for the women's tournament for the first time.

Peru was barred from the competition and was replaced with the next best team not qualified, Colombia.

Men's 3x3

Women's 3x3

See also
 Basketball at the 2020 Summer Olympics

References

External links
Results book – Basketball
Results book – 3x3 Basketball

 
 
basketball
2019
2019
2019–20 in South American basketball
2019–20 in North American basketball
International basketball competitions hosted by Peru